The Terrys are an Australian indie folk band formed in early 2020, consisting of Jacob Finch (vocals), Lukas Anderson (lead guitar), Ben Salvatori (rhythm guitar), Cameron Cooper (drums) and Trent Cooper (bass). 
The band released their debut EP titled The TerrySonic Mixtape in September 2021. 

The Terrys released their debut studio album, True Colour in October 2022, which peaked at number 17 on the ARIA Charts in March 2023.

Members
 Jacob Finch – vocals
 Lukas Anderson – lead guitar
 Ben Salvatori – rhythm guitar
 Cameron Cooper – drums
 Trent Cooper – bass

Discography

Studio albums

Extended plays

References

Australian indie pop groups
Australian indie rock groups
Australian indie folk groups
Musical groups established in 2020
Musical groups from Sydney